Juan Bautista Ibaibarriaga (29 August 1898 – 23 March 1925) was a Spanish footballer who usually played as a midfielder for Arenas de Getxo. The dates of his birth and death are unknown. The highlight of his career was scoring one of the winning goals of the 1919 Copa del Rey Final as Arenas defeated the powerful FC Barcelona 5–2. Like many other Arenas Club players of that time, he played a few games for the Biscay national team, participating in both the 1922–23 and the 1923–24 Prince of Asturias Cups, an official inter-regional competition organized by the RFEF. Both campaigns ended in narrow defeats to Asturias (3–4) and Catalonia (0–1).

Honours
Arenas Club
North Championship: 1918–19, 1921–22
Copa del Rey: 1919

References

Year of birth missing
Spanish footballers
Association football midfielders
Year of death missing
Arenas Club de Getxo footballers
Footballers from Getxo
1898 births
1925 deaths